Yunieski Abreu (born 1 September 1981) is a paralympic athlete from Cuba competing mainly in category T13 middle and long-distance events.

Yunieski competed in the 800m, 1500m and 5000m in the 2004 Summer Paralympics winning a bronze medal in the 5000m.  Unfortunately he could not follow this in Beijing in the 2008 Summer Paralympics where competing in only the 1500m he failed to make the final.

References

Paralympic athletes of Cuba
Athletes (track and field) at the 2004 Summer Paralympics
Athletes (track and field) at the 2008 Summer Paralympics
Paralympic bronze medalists for Cuba
Living people
1981 births
Medalists at the 2004 Summer Paralympics
Paralympic medalists in athletics (track and field)
Cuban male middle-distance runners
Cuban male long-distance runners
21st-century Cuban people